Fourth normal form (4NF) is a normal form used in database normalization. Introduced by Ronald Fagin in 1977, 4NF is the next level of normalization after Boyce–Codd normal form (BCNF). Whereas the second, third, and Boyce–Codd normal forms are concerned with functional dependencies, 4NF is concerned with a more general type of dependency known as a multivalued dependency. A table is in 4NF if and only if, for every one of its non-trivial multivalued dependencies X  Y, X is a superkey—that is, X is either a candidate key or a superset thereof.

Multivalued dependencies
If the column headings in a relational database table are divided into three disjoint groupings X, Y, and Z, then, in the context of a particular row, we can refer to the data beneath each group of headings as x, y, and z respectively. A multivalued dependency X  Y signifies that if we choose any x actually occurring in the table (call this choice xc), and compile a list of all the xcyz combinations that occur in the table, we will find that xc is associated with the same y entries regardless of z. So essentially the presence of z provides no useful information to constrain the possible values of y.

A trivial multivalued dependency X  Y is one where either Y is a subset of X, or X and Y together form the whole set of attributes of the relation.

A functional dependency is a special case of multivalued dependency. In a functional dependency X → Y, every x determines exactly one y, never more than one.

Example
Consider the following example:

Each row indicates that a given restaurant can deliver a given variety of pizza to a given area.

The table has no non-key attributes because its only candidate key is {Restaurant, Pizza Variety, Delivery Area}. Therefore, it meets all normal forms up to BCNF. If we assume, however, that pizza varieties offered by a restaurant are not affected by delivery area (i.e. a restaurant offers all pizza varieties it makes to all areas it supplies), then it does not meet 4NF. The problem is that the table features two non-trivial multivalued dependencies on the {Restaurant} attribute (which is not a superkey). The dependencies are:

 {Restaurant}  {Pizza Variety}
 {Restaurant}  {Delivery Area}

These non-trivial multivalued dependencies on a non-superkey reflect the fact that the varieties of pizza a restaurant offers are independent from the areas to which the restaurant delivers. This state of affairs leads to redundancy in the table: for example, we are told three times that A1 Pizza offers Stuffed Crust, and if A1 Pizza starts producing Cheese Crust pizzas then we will need to add multiple rows, one for each of A1 Pizza's delivery areas. There is, moreover, nothing to prevent us from doing this incorrectly: we might add Cheese Crust rows for all but one of A1 Pizza's delivery areas, thereby failing to respect the multivalued dependency {Restaurant}  {Pizza Variety}.

To eliminate the possibility of these anomalies, we must place the facts about varieties offered into a different table from the facts about delivery areas, yielding two tables that are both in 4NF:

In contrast, if the pizza varieties offered by a restaurant sometimes did legitimately vary from one delivery area to another, the original three-column table would satisfy 4NF.

Ronald Fagin demonstrated that it is always possible to achieve 4NF. Rissanen's theorem is also applicable on multivalued dependencies.

4NF in practice
A 1992 paper by Margaret S. Wu notes that the teaching of database normalization typically stops short of 4NF, perhaps because of a belief that tables violating 4NF (but meeting all lower normal forms) are rarely encountered in business applications. This belief may not be accurate, however. Wu reports that in a study of forty organizational databases, over 20% contained one or more tables that violated 4NF while meeting all lower normal forms.

Normalization beyond 4NF
Only in rare situations does a 4NF table not conform to the higher normal form 5NF. These are situations in which a complex real-world constraint governing the valid combinations of attribute values in the 4NF table is not implicit in the structure of that table.

See also
Attribute-value system
Injective function
Bijection

References

Further reading

Date, C. J. (1999), An Introduction to Database Systems (8th ed.). Addison-Wesley Longman. .
Kent, W. (1983) A Simple Guide to Five Normal Forms in Relational Database Theory, Communications of the ACM, vol. 26, pp. 120–125

4NF

de:Normalisierung (Datenbank)#Vierte Normalform (4NF)